Arvīds Jansons (10 October 1914 – 21 November 1984) was a Latvian conductor and father of conductor Mariss Jansons.

Jansons was born in Liepāja. He studied violin from 1929 until 1935 at the Conservatory of Liepāja, then composition and conducting (under Leo Blech) at the Conservatory of Riga from 1940 until 1944 while working as violinist at Riga Opera. In 1944 he was appointed conductor of Riga Opera, then of the Latvian Radio Orchestra (1947–1952). In 1952 he was appointed reserve conductor, and tour conductor, of the Leningrad Philharmonic behind Yevgeny Mravinsky and Kurt Sanderling.

Jansons became principal guest conductor of the Hallé Orchestra in 1965. He collapsed and died from a heart attack in 1984 while conducting a concert with the Hallé in Manchester. He is buried next to Karl Eliasberg in Volkovo Cemetery, Saint Petersburg.

Recordings
For Melodiya
 Antonín Dvořák: Symphony No. 9 in E minor (From the New World) USSR Symphony Orchestra
 César Franck; Symphony in D minor
 Franz Liszt; Symphonic poem Tasso, Leningrad Philharmonic Orchestra
 Andrei Petrov: Poem, for strings, organ, four trumpets, and percussion Leningrad Philharmonic Orchestra
 Pyotr Tchaikovsky; Suite No. 1 and Symphony No. 3 Polish Moscow Radio Symphony Orchestra
 Manuel de Falla; El amor brujo with Irina Arkhipova.
, Sweden
 Hilding Rosenberg; Violin Concerto No. 2, Leon Spierer, Royal Stockholm Philharmonic Orchestra

Radio archives
BBC
 Dmitri Shostakovich: Symphony No. 5; Tchaikovsky's Sleeping Beauty (1971)
 Gustav Mahler: Symphony No. 5 (1984, final performance, sound archive of the British Library)

References

Latvian conductors (music)
Male conductors (music)
Soviet conductors (music)
Latvian Academy of Music alumni
Conductors (music) who died while conducting
1914 births
1984 deaths
20th-century conductors (music)
Musicians from Liepāja
20th-century male musicians